Training Day is a 2001 American crime thriller film directed by Antoine Fuqua and written by David Ayer. It stars Denzel Washington as Alonzo Harris and Ethan Hawke as Jake Hoyt, two LAPD narcotics officers over a 24-hour period in the gang-ridden neighborhoods of Westlake, Echo Park, and South Central Los Angeles. It also features Scott Glenn, Eva Mendes, Cliff Curtis, Dr. Dre, Snoop Dogg, and Macy Gray in supporting roles.

Training Day was released on October 5, 2001, by Warner Bros. Pictures. It received positive reviews from critics, who praised Washington and Hawke's performances but were divided on the screenplay. It was a commercial success, grossing $104 million worldwide against a production budget of $45 million.

The film received numerous accolades and nominations, with Washington's performance earning him the Academy Award for Best Actor and Hawke being nominated for Best Supporting Actor at the 74th Academy Awards.

A television series based on the film, produced by Jerry Bruckheimer, was announced in August 2015 and premiered February 2, 2017 on CBS, but was cancelled after one season. A prequel about a young Alonzo Harris was announced in October 2019 as currently being in development by Warner Bros. Pictures. On February 28, 2022, a prequel titled Training Day: Day of the Riot started production in California.

Plot

Ambitious Los Angeles Police Department Officer Jake Hoyt is up for promotion and is assigned to Detective Alonzo Harris, a highly decorated narcotics officer, for a one-day evaluation. Driving around in Alonzo's Monte Carlo, they begin the day by catching some college kids buying marijuana. Alonzo confiscates the drugs, puts it into a pipe and tells Jake to smoke it. When Jake refuses, Alonzo threatens him at gunpoint, stating that refusing like this while on the streets would get him killed. Jake smokes the pipe, and Alonzo smiles, telling him that it was laced with PCP.

After paying a visit to Roger, an ex-cop turned drug dealer, Jake notices a pair of addicts attempting to rape a teenage girl in an alley. Jake intervenes while Alonzo watches. After the girl leaves and Alonzo scares the addicts off, Jake finds the girl's wallet on the ground and retrieves it.

Later, Alonzo and Jake apprehend a dealer named Blue, finding crack rocks and a loaded handgun on him. Rather than go to jail, Blue informs on his employer Kevin "Sandman" Miller, who is in prison. Using a fake search warrant, Alonzo steals $40,000 from Sandman's home. At lunch, the two visit Alonzo's mistress Sara and their young son. Alonzo then meets with a trio of corrupt high-ranking police officials he dubs the "Three Wise Men." Aware that the Russian Mafia is hunting Alonzo over a large unpaid debt, they suggest that he skip town. Alonzo insists he has control of the situation and trades the $40,000 for an arrest warrant.

Using the warrant, Alonzo, Jake, and four other narcotics officers return to Roger's house and seize $4 million, a quarter of which Alonzo keeps. Alonzo shoots and kills Roger when Jake refuses, staging the scene with his men to make the shooting look justified. Infuriated, Jake gets into a Mexican standoff with the corrupt officers. However, Alonzo, having planned the day's events, has a trump card: a routine post-incident blood test will flag the PCP-laced cannabis Jake smoked earlier and end his career. Alonzo promises to protect Jake for his cooperation, and Jake is forced to comply.

Later that evening, Alonzo drives Jake to the home of a Sureño gangster named "Smiley" for an errand. Jake reluctantly plays poker with Smiley and his fellow gang members as he waits for Alonzo. As they talk, Smiley reveals Alonzo's situation: by midnight, Alonzo must pay $1 million to the Russians for killing one of their men in Las Vegas, or be killed himself. Realizing that Alonzo abandoned him and has paid Smiley to kill him, Jake attempts to flee but is beaten and dragged to the bathroom to be executed. Before they can kill Jake, a gang member searches him for money and finds the wallet of the teenage girl, who happens to be Smiley's cousin. After calling his cousin and confirming that Jake saved her, Smiley releases Jake out of gratitude.

Jake returns to Sara's apartment to arrest Alonzo just as he is leaving to pay the Russians with Roger's money. A gunfight and chase ensue, and Alonzo is eventually subdued on the street while the entire neighborhood gathers to watch. Alonzo offers money to whoever kills Jake to no avail. Jake takes the stolen cash to submit as criminal evidence against Alonzo and the neighborhood gang allows him to leave safely. Enraged, Alonzo threatens to retaliate against the gang members, but they ignore him and walk away unimpressed.

Alonzo flees for LAX, but he is ambushed and executed by the Russians. Jake returns home as the press reports on Alonzo's death.

Cast

 Ethan Hawke as Officer Jake Hoyt
 Denzel Washington as Detective Alonzo Harris
 Scott Glenn as Roger
 Eva Mendes as Sara
 Cliff Curtis as "Smiley"
 Raymond Cruz as "Sniper"
 Noel Gugliemi as Moreno
 Dr. Dre as Detective Paul
 Peter Greene as Detective Jeff
 Nick Chinlund as Detective Tim
 Jaime P. Gomez as Detective Mark
 Snoop Dogg as "Blue"
 Macy Gray as Sandman's Wife
 Charlotte Ayanna as Lisa Hoyt
 Harris Yulin as Detective Doug Rosselli
 Tom Berenger as Detective Stanley "Stan" Gursky
 Raymond J. Barry as Captain Lou Jacobs
 Samantha Esteban as "Letty"
 Seidy López as "Dreamer"
 Rudy Perez as "Pee-Wee"
 Cle Shaheed Sloan as "Bone"
 Abel Soto as Neto
 Denzel Whitaker as Dimitri
 Fran Kranz as College Driver
 Terry Crews as Pigeon Flipper

Casting

Davis Guggenheim was originally attached to direct the film, with Matt Damon as Jake Hoyt and Samuel L. Jackson as Alonzo Harris. Once Washington became attached to the project, however, he requested to have Guggenheim replaced. Eminem was offered the role of Jake Hoyt, but turned it down to star in 8 Mile. Tobey Maguire, Paul Walker, Freddie Prinze Jr., Ryan Phillippe, and Scott Speedman tested for the role of Jake Hoyt.

Production

Development
Although corruption in L.A.'s C.R.A.S.H. unit was yet to be exposed when Training Day was written, Antoine Fuqua has stated that the emergence of the Rampart Scandal in the late 1990s catalyzed the completion of the film. Denzel Washington also grew a beard in order to emulate the appearance of Rafael Pérez, an LAPD narcotics officer involved in multiple scandals. Fuqua wanted Washington's character to be seductive and part of a machine, and not just a random rogue cop. In Washington's own words: "I think in some ways he's done his job too well. He's learned how to manipulate, how to push the line further and further, and, in the process, he's become more hard-core than some of the guys he's chasing."

Fuqua also saw Ethan Hawke's character as generally honorable but so driven by ambition that he was willing to compromise his principles, particularly when following the charming and persuasive example of Washington's character. He has said that he fought with studio executives who wanted to cut the Three Wise Men scene, thinking it slowed the film. He insisted that the Wise Men scene was pivotal in establishing that at least some of Alonzo's illegal actions were sanctioned by his superiors who regarded unethical behavior as a necessary evil.

Fuqua wanted Training Day to look as authentic as possible, and he shot on location in some of the most infamous neighborhoods of Los Angeles. He even obtained permission to shoot in the Imperial Courts housing project, the first time L.A. street gangs had allowed film crew to be brought into that neighborhood. The crew also filmed in Hoover Block and Baldwin Village. Parts of the film were shot on a dead end street called Palmwood Drive, where the Black P. Stones Blood gang members were seen on the rooftops. Cle Shaheed Sloan, the gang technical advisor of Training Day, managed to get on screen real-life gang members from Rollin' 60 Crips, PJ Watts Crips, and B. P. Stones (a Bloods set). According to Fuqua, the actors and crew ended up receiving a warm welcome from local residents. When he was unable to shoot a scene directly on location, he recreated the locations on sets.

There were also two police officers on hand as technical advisors, Michael Patterson and Paul Lozada (the latter from the San Francisco Police Department). Washington, Hawke and other cast members also met with undercover police officers, local drug dealers, and gang members to help them understand their roles better.

Music

A soundtrack containing hip hop music was released on September 11, 2001, by Priority Records. It peaked at 35 on the Billboard 200 and 19 on the Top R&B/Hip-Hop Albums and spawned two hit singles, Nelly's "#1" and Dr. Dre and DJ Quik's "Put It on Me".

Release

Training Day was originally scheduled for release on September 21, 2001, and had a strong advertising push. However, following the September 11 attacks, the film was pushed back until October 5, 2001, and opened at number one, grossing $24.2 million. Upon opening, it achieved the second-highest October opening weekend, behind Meet the Parents. In its second week of release, the film's grossed $13.4 million, staying at the number one position. The film stayed in the top-ten box office until the seventh week of release, landing at number 12. With an estimated budget of $45 million, Training Day ultimately grossed $76.6 million in the US and $104.9 million worldwide.

Reception
On review aggregate website Rotten Tomatoes, Training Day holds an approval rating 73% based on 161 reviews, with an average rating of 6.50/10. The site's critical consensus reads, "The ending may be less than satisfying, but Denzel Washington reminds us why he's such a great actor in this taut and brutal police drama." On Metacritic, the film has a weighted average score of 69 out of 100, based on 35 critics, indicating "generally favorable reviews". Audiences polled by CinemaScore gave the film an average grade of "B+" on an A+ to F scale.

Chicago Sun-Times film critic Roger Ebert said: "Washington seems to enjoy a performance that's over the top and down the other side". Ebert gave the film three out of four stars, praising both the lead and supporting actors and the film's gritty, kinetic energy. He noted several plot holes and wrote that "[a] lot of people are going to be leaving the theater as I did, wondering about the logic and plausibility of the last 15 minutes."

Writing in The Hollywood Reporter, Michael Rechtshaffen gave the film a positive review on September 12, 2016, when he stated: "Denzel Washington ventures into the dark side as a seriously corrupt narcotics cop in Training Day, and the results are electrifying. So is the picture, thanks to taut, sinewy direction by Antoine Fuqua and a compelling script by David Ayer (The Fast and the Furious)."

Denzel Washington's performance as Detective Alonzo Harris was highly praised by critics. In The Village Voice, Amy Taubin expressed: "Training Day, Antoine Fuqua's propulsive, elegantly written police thriller, offers the unsettling spectacle of Denzel Washington, whose old-fashioned combination of decency and sexiness suggests the African American counterpart to Gregory Peck (in his To Kill a Mockingbird period), as an LAPD cop so evil he makes Harvey Keitel's Bad Lieutenant look like even smaller potatoes than he was meant to be".

Accolades

 
In June 2003, the American Film Institute named Alonzo Harris the 50th greatest screen villain of all time in its list AFI's 100 Years...100 Heroes & Villains.

TV series adaptation

On August 7, 2015, it was announced that Antoine Fuqua had decided to develop a television series based on the movie, and had teamed with Jerry Bruckheimer to develop the concept. Warner Bros. Television was shopping the show to the American broadcast networks. Will Beall would write the series, while Fuqua would serve as executive producer, and would direct the potential pilot. CBS ordered a pilot on August 14, 2015. In addition to Fuqua, Bruckheimer, Beall, and Jonathan Littman will serve as executive producers for the series, which is set 15 years after the original film.  In May 2016, CBS picked up the series.

In the CBS television series Alonzo is mentioned by Deputy Chief Joy Lockhart when briefing Officer Kyle Craig on sending him undercover at LAPD's Special Investigation Section to investigate Detective Frank Roarke. Frank briefly mentions Alonzo at the end of the first season. The series, starring Bill Paxton and Justin Cornwell premiered on February 2, 2017.

On May 17, 2017, Antonie Fuqua announced the series had been canceled after one season and four months after Paxton's death.

Prequel
In October 2019, it was reported that Warner Bros. was developing a prequel to Training Day. The prequel follows a young Alonzo Harris in late April 1992, two days before the verdict of the Rodney King trial and the L.A. riots. On February 28, 2022, the prequel, named Training Day: Day of the Riot has started production in California.

See also
 Denzel Washington on screen and stage
 List of hood films
 Crown Vic (2019 film)

Notes

References

External links

 
 
 
 
 
 

2001 films
2001 crime thriller films
2001 crime drama films
2000s buddy cop films
2000s gang films
American buddy cop films
American crime thriller films
American gang films
American neo-noir films
American police detective films
African-American films
2000s English-language films
Fictional portrayals of the Los Angeles Police Department
Films about drugs
Films about police brutality
Films about the Russian Mafia
Films about police misconduct
Films adapted into television shows
Films directed by Antoine Fuqua
Films featuring a Best Actor Academy Award-winning performance
Films postponed due to the September 11 attacks
Films scored by Mark Mancina
Films set in Los Angeles
Films shot in California
Films with screenplays by David Ayer
Hood films
Village Roadshow Pictures films
Warner Bros. films
Films about law enforcement in the United States
American films about cannabis
2000s American films